Starry Night is the sixth and final extended play by South Korean girl group Momoland. It was released by MLD Entertainment and distributed by Kakao M on June 11, 2020. For the extended play, Momoland worked with a variety of producers including Bull$EyE, real-fantasy, Ondine and Yoske. Starry Night consists of six tracks including the single of the same name and its English version and instrumental, and the Korean version of the previously released songs "Chiri Chiri" and "Pinky Love".

Commercially, the album peaked at number twenty-one on South Korea's Gaon Album Chart.

Background and release
Momoland as a six-member group, released the song "Thumbs Up" from their second single album of the same name in December 2019. Following "Thumbs Up", MLD Entertainment announced in May 15, 2020, that Momoland would be making their comeback in June 2020.

Prior to the release of Starry Night, teasers featuring photos of Momoland from the extended play's photoshoot, and snippet of the songs were released online in June 2020. The extended play was officially released on June 11, 2020 by MLD Entertainment and distributed by Kakao M, with the lead single of the same title.

Commercial performance 
In South Korea, the extended play debuted and peaked at number twenty-one on the Gaon Album Chart for the week ending June 13, 2020. It was the seventy-fifth most selling album on the Gaon Album Chart for the month of June 2020 with 4,817 copies sold.

Track listing

Charts

Credits and personnel
Credits adapted from Melon.
 Momoland – vocals , lyricist 
 Alive Knob – lyricist 
 Bull$EyE – lyrics , composer, arrangement
 Kim Chae-won – chorus, guitar, recorder
 Kim Do Da Ri – lyricist , composer 
 keepintouch - lyricist 
 Manbo – lyricist  , composer 
 Ondine – lyricist , composer , arrangement 
 real-fantasy – drums, programming, lyricist , composer, arrangement, keyboard
 Team AMG – mixing
 Hwang Min-hee – recorder 
 Kwon Nam Woo – mastering
 Yoske – lyricist  , composer , arrangement

Release history

References 

Momoland albums
2020 EPs